An odalisque was a chambermaid or a female attendant in a Turkish seraglio, particularly the court ladies in the household of the Ottoman sultan. In western usage, the term came to mean the harem concubine, and refers to the eroticized artistic genre in which a woman is represented mostly or completely nude in a reclining position, often in the setting of a harem.

Etymology

The word "odalisque" is French in form and originates from the Turkish odalık, meaning "chambermaid", from oda, "chamber" or "room". It can also be transliterated odahlic, odalisk, and odaliq.

Joan DelPlato has described the term's shift in meaning from Turkish to English and French:

The English and French term odalisque (rarely odalique) derives from the Turkish 'oda', meaning "chamber"; thus an odalisque originally meant a chamber girl or attendant. In western usage, the term has come to refer specifically to the harem concubine. By the eighteenth century the term odalisque referred to the eroticized artistic genre in which a nominally eastern woman lies on her side on display for the spectator.

Origin as the Turkish odalık
An odalik was a maid who tended to the harem, but she could eventually become a concubine. She was ranked at the bottom of the social stratification of a harem, serving not the man of the household, but rather, his concubines and wives as their personal chambermaid. Odalıklar were usually slaves given as gifts to the sultan by wealthy Turkish men. Generally, an odalık was never seen by the sultan but instead remained under the direct supervision of his mother, the Valide sultan.

If an odalık was of extraordinary beauty or had exceptional talents in dancing or singing, she would be trained as a possible concubine. If selected, an odalık trained as a court lady would serve the sultan sexually and only after such sexual contact would she change in status, becoming thenceforth one of the consorts of the sultan.

Later Western usage of the term

W. S. Gilbert refers to the "Grace of an odalisque on a divan" in Colonel Calverley's song "If You Want A Receipt For That Popular Mystery" from the Gilbert and Sullivan opera Patience.

In popular use, the word odalisque also may refer to a mistress, concubine or paramour of a wealthy man.

During the 19th century, odalisques became common figures in the artistic movement known as Orientalism, being featured in many erotic paintings from that era. 

By the later 19th century, Turkish writers such as Melek Hanum used the word odalisque to refer to slave-concubines when writing in English:If any lady possesses a pretty-looking slave, the fact soon gets known. The gentlemen who wish to buy an odalisque or a wife, make their offers. Many Turks, indeed, prefer to take a slave as a wife, as, in such case, there is no need to dread fathers, mothers, or brothers-in-law, and other undesirable relations.

In 2011, the Law Society of British Columbia brought a disciplinary hearing against an unnamed lawyer for referring to another lawyer's client as living with an odalisque. The Law Society found that the word's use, though an extremely poor choice, did not rise to the level of professional misconduct: “[28] … A lawyer, more than anyone, should be aware of the importance of using words carefully, alive to their nuances. Whether his failure to do so is the product of naïveté, as suggested by his counsel, stupidity or lack of care, it is at least unintelligent and certainly inexcusable.”

See also
Ottoman Imperial Harem
Culture of the Ottoman Empire
Hammam
Islamic views on slavery
Köçek
Ottoman Turkish language

References

Sources
 Jeffrey Eugenides (2013) Middlesex; pg 495 "... Stretched across the couch, a Pisceasn Odalisque..."
 The Imperial Harem by Leslie Pierce
 The Nature of the Early Ottoman State by Heath W Lowry

External links

Ottoman imperial harem